Dipshikha Chakravortty is an Indian microbiologist, molecular pathologist and a professor at the department of Microbiology and Cell Biology at the Indian Institute of Science. Known for her studies on Salmonella and antibacterial resistance, Chakravortty is an elected fellow of the National Academy of Sciences, India, the Indian Academy of Sciences and the Indian National Science Academy. The Department of Biotechnology of the Government of India awarded her the National Bioscience Award for Career Development, one of the highest Indian science awards, for her contributions to biosciences, in 2010.

Biography 

Dipshikha Chakravortty was born in 1968 at Jabalpur, in the second largest Indian state of Madhya Pradesh to Santosh Kumar Chakravortty and Bani Chakravortty. Her early schooling was in Mumbai where the family had moved soon after her birth. After earning a bachelor's degree in microbiology from LAD College for Women of Rashtrasant Tukadoji Maharaj Nagpur University, and a master's degree in microbiology from the University of Nagpur. She did her doctoral studies, assisted by junior and senior research fellowships, under the guidance of K. S. Nandakumar at the National Centre for Cell Science which secured her a PhD from Savitribai Phule Pune University. Thereafter, she moved to Japan for her post-doctoral studies and completed it under the supervision of Takashi Yokochi of Aichi Medical University. Subsequently, she took up a research position at the laboratory of Michael Hensel in Erlangen, Germany and worked there on an Alexander von Humboldt fellowship. On her return to India in 2004, she joined the Department of Microbiology and Cell Biology of the Indian Institute of Science (IISc) as a faculty, where she holds the position of a professor. At IISc, she has established her laboratory, Molecular Pathogenesis Lab and hosts a number of researchers and scholars.

Chakravortty resides at IISc Campus, in Bengaluru, Karnataka.

Professional profile 

Chakravortty's research focus is on antibacterial resistance with special emphasis on Salmonella and she is known to have done work on the pathogenesis of Salmonella typhimurium, a gram negative bacterium pathogen. Her laboratory works on diseases such as Typhoid, and the host-pathogen interaction with regard to the disease, with a view to develop a vaccine with a long-time memory against the pathogen. The team led by her has been successful in developing a treatment protocol for sepsis which uses a Bactericidal/permeability-increasing protein, a type of glycoprotein, which has been found to neutralize the bacterial endotoxin, one of the primary causative factors of sepsis. Her studies have been documented by way of a number of articles and ResearchGate, an online repository of scientific articles has listed 169 of them. Besides, she has contributed chapters to books edited by others. She has also mentored many research scholars in their doctoral studies.

Dipshikha Chakravortty was a Hostel Chair during the critical time of the Covid Pandemic from 2019 to 2021 Jan, during which she along with the team has established the Student isolation center and took care of more than 4500 students. Personally, she has taken care of them and nurtured their mental well-being during this critical phase. Her mentorship skills lead the young students from her group to take up various leading positions in institutes and other Universities, including IISc. Apart from taking care of students from Biological Sciences, she also took care of students across the division.

Awards and honors 
Prof Dipshikha Chakravortty, received the prestigious Tata Innovation Fellowship, 2020–21, for her overall research excellence. Prof. Chakravortty was awarded the prestigious Yogmaya Devi Award in Biological/Medical Sciences, in recognition of significant research contributions in any branch of Biological/Medical Sciences for 2021. The Department of Biotechnology (DBT) of the Government of India awarded her the National Bioscience Award for Career Development, one of the highest Indian science awards in 2010. The National Academy of Sciences, India elected her as a fellow in 2012 and she became an elected fellow of the Indian National Science Academy in 2017. The Indian Academy of Sciences elected her as a fellow in 2021. She is also a recipient of Prof S. K. Chatterjee award of the Indian Institute of Science (2021), NASI-Reliance Platinum Jubilee Award (2015), DAE SRC Outstanding Investigator Award (2015), Alexander von Humboldt fellowship and was a member of the IISc Team that won gold medal at iGEM 2017 and iGEM 2018 contest, held in Boston.

Selected bibliography

Chapters

Articles 
Chakravortty D*,Basu S Nandakumar KS , 2021 Spacefareres, protect our planets from 
falling debris, Nature , 597,178 , doi: https://doi.org/10.1038/d41586-021-02396-8

O Hegde, R Chatterjee, A Rasheed, D Chakravortty*, S Basu*, 2021, Multiscale vapor�mediated dendritic pattern formation and bacterial aggregation in complex respiratory 
biofluid droplets, J Colloid Interface Sci. 15;606(Pt 2):2011-2023. doi: 
10.1016/j.jcis.2021.09.158. Epub 2021 Oct 6.

Majee S, Saha A, Chaudhuri S, Chakravortty D, Basu S.2021, Two-dimensional 
mathematical framework for evaporation dynamics of respiratory droplets. Phys Fluids
(1994). 2021 Oct;33(10):103302. doi: 10.1063/5.0064635. Epub 2021 Oct 1

S Majee, AR Chowdhury, A Chattopadhyay, R Pinto, A Agharkar,, Chakravortty D*, 
Basu S*, 2021, Spatiotemporal evaporating droplet dynamics on fomites enhances long 
term bacterial pathogenesis, Commun. Biol , Oct 8;4(1):1173. doi: 10.1038/s42003-021-
02711-z.
Krishan B, Gupta D, Vadlamudi G, Sharma S, Chakravorty D, Basu S, 2021, 
Efficacy of homemade face masks against human coughs: Insights on penetration, 
atomization and aerosolization of cough droplets, Physics of Fluid, 33,093309 ( Chosen 
 as featured article)

Chakravortty D, Nandakumar KS , 2021, Lessons from the pandemic: taking a covid�like approach to other diseases., BMJ. 2021 Jul 1;374:n1644. doi: 10.1136/bmj.n1644

Hajra D, Nair AV, Chakravortty D , 2021, An elegant nano-injection machinery for 
sabotaging the host: Role of Type III secretion system in virulence of different human 
and animal pathogenic bacteria. Phys Life Rev. 2021 May 26:S1571-0645(21)00036-1. 
doi: 10.1016/j.plrev.2021.05.007.

Gopalam R, Datey A, Bijoor S, Chakravortty D, Tumaney AW , 2021, Biochemical 
Characterization of Acyl-CoA: Lysophosphatidylcholine Acyltransferase (LPCAT) 
Enzyme from the Seeds of Salvia hispanica. Mol Biotechnol. Jun 15. doi: 
10.1007/s12033-021-00354-3.
15

Yadav S, Singh AK, Agrahari AK, Pandey AK, Gupta MK, Chakravortty D, Tiwari 
VK, Prakash P.2021,Galactose-Clicked Curcumin-Mediated Reversal of Meropenem 
Resistance among Klebsiella pneumoniae by Targeting Its Carbapenemases and the 
AcrAB-TolC Efflux System, Antibiotics (Basel), 4:388. doi: 
10.3390/antibiotics10040388

Ravichandran S, Banerjee U, Dr GD, Kandukuru R, Thakur C, Chakravortty D, Balaji 
KN, Singh A, Chandra N, 2021, VB 10, a new blood biomarker for differential diagnosis 
and recovery monitoring of acute viral and bacterial infections, EBioMedicine.
67:103352. doi: 10.1016/j.ebiom.2021.103352. Online ahead of print

Dhingra D, Marathe SM, Sharma N, Marathe A, Chakravortty D, 2021, Modelling 
immune response to Salmonella during typhoid, Int Immunol , DOI�10.1093/intimm/dxab003

Singh Y , Datey A, Chakravortty D, Tumaney AW, 2021, Novel Cell-Based Assay to 
Investigate Monoacylglycerol Acyltransferase 2 Inhibitory Activity Using HIEC-6 Cell 
Line, ACS Omega (https://dx.doi.org/10.1021/acsomega.0c05950)

Chatterjee R, Chowdhury AR, Mukherjee D, Chakravortty D,2021, Lipid larceny: 
Channelizing host Lipids for establishing successful pathogenesis by bacteria, Virulence. 
2020 Dec 26. doi: 10.1080/21505594.2020.1869441. Online ahead of print.

Marathe SA, Chakravortty D, The Nobel Prize in Chemistry 2020: Celebrating the 
collaborative efforts leading to a tool (CRISPR-Cas) for rewriting a code of life,
CURRENT SCIENCE 119 (10), 1603-1605

Datey A, Gopalan J, Chakravortty D, 2020, Needleless or Noninvasive Delivery 
Technology., Methods Mol Biol. 2021;2183:437-446.

Hajra D, Datey A, Chakravortty D ,2020, Attenuation Methods for Live Vaccines., 
Methods Mol Biol. 2021;2183:331-356.

Karmakar K, Krishna S, Majumdar S, Nath U, Nataraj KN, Prakash 
NB, Chakravortty D,2020, Co-cultivation of Beta vulgaris limits the pre-harvest 
colonization of foodborne pathogen (Salmonella spp.) on tomato Int J Food 
Microbiol. 2020 Jun 20;332:108768. doi: 10.1016/j.ijfoodmicro.2020.108768. Online 
ahead of print

Bhosle A, Datey A, Chandrasekharan G, Singh D, Chakravortty D, Chandra N.A, 2020,  Strategic Target Rescues Trimethoprim Sensitivity in Escherichia coli.
iScience. 2020 Mar 16;23(4):100986. doi: 10.1016/j.isci.2020.100986. [Epub ahead of print

Datey A, Thaha CSA, Patil SR, Gopalan J, Chakravortty D.,2019, Shockwave Therapy Efficiently Cures Multispecies Chronic Periodontitis in a Humanized Rat Model. Front Bioeng Biotechnol. 2019 Dec 13;7:382. doi: 10.3389/fbioe.2019.00382. eCollection

Nagarajan D, Roy N, Kulkarni O, Datey A, Ravichandran S, Thakur C, Sandeep T, Aprameya IV, Sarma SP, Chakravortty D*, Chandra N*, 2019, Omega76: A designed antimicrobial peptide to 1 combat carbapenem and tigecycline resistant ESKAPE pathogens Science Advances,5(7):eaax1946.

Balakrishnan A, Chakravortty D, 2017,  Bactericidal/permeability increasing- Epithelial cell damage activates protein  expression in epithelial cells, Frontier in Microbiology, 2017 Aug 15;8:1567. doi: 10.3389/fmicb.2017.01567.

Datey A, Janardhan Gm Gopalan J, Chakravortty D,2017, Mechanism of transformation in Mycobacteria using a novel shockwave assisted technique driven by in situ generated oxyhydrogen, Sci Rep,  2017 Aug 17;7(1):8645. doi: 10.1038/s41598-017-08542-5.

Balakrishnan A, DasSarma P, Bhattacharjee O, Kim JM, DasSarma S, Chakravortty D. 2017, Halobacterial nano vesicles displaying murine bactericidal permeability-increasing protein rescue mice from lethal endotoxic shock., Sci Rep. Sep 20;6:33679.

Balakrishnan A, Schnare M, Chakravortty D. 2016 Of men not mice: Bactericidal/permeability-increasing protein (BPI) expressed in human macrophages acts as a phagocytic receptor and modulates entry and replication of Gram-negative bacteria., Frontiers in Immunol. 7,455.

Das P, Lahiri A, Chakravortty D,2010, Modulation of the arginase pathway in the context of microbial pathogenesis: a metabolic enzyme moonlighting as an immune modulator. PLoS Pathog, 6, e1000899.

See also 

 Nanocarriers
 Drug delivery

Notes

References

External links 
 

N-BIOS Prize recipients
Indian scientific authors
Living people
Indian medical researchers
1968 births
Medical doctors from Madhya Pradesh
Indian microbiologists
Indian pathologists
People from Jabalpur
Fellows of the Indian National Science Academy
Fellows of The National Academy of Sciences, India
Rashtrasant Tukadoji Maharaj Nagpur University alumni
Savitribai Phule Pune University alumni